Halil Mete Soner is a Turkish American mathematician born in Ankara.
Soner's current research interests are nonlinear partial differential equations; asymptotic analysis of Ginzburg-Landau type systems, viscosity solutions, and mathematical finance.

Education
After graduating from the Ankara Science High School (Ankara Fen Lisesi), he started  his university education at the Middle East Technical University in Ankara, later transferred to  Boğaziçi University, Istanbul in 1977. He received a B.Sc. in mathematics and another in electrical engineering simultaneously in 1981, both in first-rank. Soner then attended Brown University in Providence, RI, U.S. on a research fellowship, where he obtained his M.Sc. (1983) and Ph.D. (1986) in applied mathematics.

Career
In 1985, Soner was research associate at the Institute for Mathematics and Applied Sciences in Minneapolis, MN and, assistant professor and then professor between 1986-1998 in the Department of Mathematical Sciences at the Carnegie Mellon University in Pittsburgh, PA. During 1997-1998 he was Research Associate at the Feza Gursey Institute for Basic Sciences in Istanbul and visiting professor of Mathematics at the Boğaziçi University, Istanbul and the University of Paris, Paris, France. From 1998 for two years, Soner was “Paul M. Whythes `55” Professor of Finance and Engineering in the Department of Operations Research and Financial Engineering at Princeton University. Then, he moved to Koç University where he served as the Dean of the College of Administrative Sciences and Economics until September 2007. From 2007 until 2009 he was the Isik Inselbag Professor of Finance in Sabancı University. From 2009 to 2019 he was a Professor of Financial Mathematics at ETH Zürich. Currently he is at Princeton.

Soner co-authored a book, with Wendell Fleming, on viscosity solutions and stochastic control; Controlled Markov Processes and Viscosity Solutions (Springer-Verlag) in 1993, which was listed among the most-cited researcher in mathematics by Thomson Science in 2004. He authored or co-authored papers on nonlinear partial differential equations, viscosity solutions, stochastic optimal control and mathematical finance.

Awards
He received the TÜBITAK-TWAS Science award in 2002, was the recipient of an ERC Advanced Investigators Grant in 2009 and the Alexander von Humboldt Foundation Research Award in 2014 and was elected as a SIAM Fellow in 2015.

Personal life
He has a son, Mehmet Ali.

References

External links
 His homepage

Year of birth missing (living people)
Living people
People from Ankara
Turkish mathematicians
American people of Turkish descent
Middle East Technical University alumni
Boğaziçi University alumni
Brown University alumni
Carnegie Mellon University faculty
Academic staff of Koç University
Princeton University faculty
Academic staff of Sabancı University
Academic staff of ETH Zurich